Alan Bennett (born 1934) is an English author and actor.

Alan Bennett may also refer to:

Alan Bennett (footballer, born 1931), English footballer for Port Vale
Alan Bennett (footballer, born 1949), Scottish footballer for Dumbarton FC
Alan Bennett (footballer, born 1981), Irish footballer for Cork City and Ireland
Alan Bennett (tenor) (born 1962), American operatic/oratorio tenor
Charles Henry Allan Bennett (1872–1923), known as Ananda Metteyya, Buddhist monk